Venera Cosmetics is a Bulgarian company that is a distributor for branded perfumery and cosmetic sector. It was founded in 1992 in Plovdiv, Bulgaria.

History

The history of the company starts from 1992 when it was founded the first perfumery store Venera Cosmetics in Plovdiv. Three years later it was founded the first warehouse of "Venera Cosmetics" starting with wholesale and distribution in most parts of Bulgaria.

In 1998, the company becomes an official distributor for brands like Henkel, Procter & Gamble, Unilever, Malizia and expands its distribution network in the country. Afterwards official representor of the brands L'Oréal and Garnier for Southern Bulgaria.

In the following years, the company grew and in 2002, it has 6 company stores and a well-established distribution and sales network throughout Southern Bulgaria and parts of Northern Bulgaria.
From 2011, Venera Cosmetics specializes and focuses on branded the perfumery sector.

Commercial activity

Commerce
The company is trading with more than 2000 products from 100+ brands. Venera Cosmetics has a warehouse and a main shop, which is located in Plovdiv and a team of 12 employees.

E-commerce
In 2011, the company launched its first official online store – fragrances.bg.

References

External links
Official website

Retail companies of Bulgaria
Retail companies established in 1992